The Fable of Oscar is a fable proposed by John L. Pollock in his book How to Build a Person to defend the idea of token physicalism, agent materialism, and strong AI. It ultimately illustrates what is needed for an Artificial Intelligence to be built and why humans are just like intelligent machines.

Fable
Once in a distant land there lived a race of Engineers. They have all their physical needs provided by the machines they have invented. One of the Engineers decide that he will create an "intelligent machine" that is much more ingenious than the more machines, in that it can actually sense, learn, and adapt to its environment as an intelligent animal.

Oscar I

The first version of the machine is called "Oscar I". It has pain sensors and "fight-or-flight" responses build within to help it survive hostile environment. In this stage Oscar I is much like the machines Hilary Putnam considers in 1960.

Oscar II 

In order for Oscar I to avoid damages in hostile environment, it must not only be able to respond to its pain sensors but also predict what is likely to happen based on its generalization of its pain sensor activations. Therefore, a "pain sensor sensor" was built to sense its pain sensors, thus giving it a rudimentary self-awareness. In this stage Oscar I is much like an amoeba as Oscar II like a worm. Amoebas respond to pain while worms learn to avoid it.

Oscar III

The problem with Oscar II is that it has no conception if the environment is fooling him. For example, he can't distinguish if a machine-eating tiger and a mirror image of such tiger. To solve such problem,  "introspective sensors" were built into Oscar II and made him "Oscar III". Oscar III can now sense the operation of its own sensors and form generalization about its reliability, thus acquired a higher degree of self-awareness. In this stage Oscar II is much like a bird as Oscar III a kitten. Kittens quickly learn about mirror image and come to ignore them while birds go on attacking their own reflection until they become exhausted.

Mind/Body Problem

Consider a world populated by Oscarites. If the Oscarites are sufficiently intelligent, it can philosophizing the difference between their outward physical state and inward mental state. While we, from our perspective, describe the Oscarites as sensing the operation of their perceptual sensors, they describe it as they are "being self-aware and being conscious".

Conclusion

In the end of the fable Pollock states that while the Engineers are fictional, Oscar is real and we are in fact the Oscarites.

See also
Mind–body problem
Robot

External links
 http://johnpollock.us/ftp/OSCAR-web-page/oscar.html
 http://philpapers.org/rec/POLOAC

References

Artificial intelligence